The Uzbek ambassador in Washington, D.C. is the official representative of the government in Tashkent to the government of the United States.

List of representatives 

Uzbekistan–United States relations

References 

 
United States
Uzbekistan